Denitsa Stoilova Gadzheva (born 6 December 1982) is a Bulgarian politician, who is currently a member of the Attack.

She joined the party when it was established in 2005 and was elected as a secretary of its youth wing.

Personal

Gadzheva is a graduate of 105 SOU in Sofia and subsequently earned a degree in Transport Management and Technology from TU-Sofia. In addition to her native Bulgarian, she knows English, German and Italian. Gadzheva was formerly in a relationship with party colleague Dimitar Stoyanov, who has since left Attack.

References 

Bulgarian conservatives
Bulgarian nationalists
21st-century Bulgarian women politicians
21st-century Bulgarian politicians
Members of the National Assembly (Bulgaria)
Attack (political party) politicians
1982 births
Living people